Ernst Kupfer (2 July 1907 – 6 November 1943) was a ground-attack pilot in the Luftwaffe of Nazi Germany during World War II  who commanded a wing (StG 2) of Stuka aircraft. He was a recipient of the Knight's Cross of the Iron Cross with Oak Leaves and Swords.

Career
On 1 October 1928, Kupfer joined the military, serving with the Bavarian Cavalry Regiment 17, 5th Escadron. From 1 May 1936 to 3 March 1937, he returned to university in preparation for his Dr. jur. degree (Doctor of Law), which he attained on 4 March 1937.

Kupfer was appointed acting Geschwaderkommodore (Wing Commander) of Sturzkampfgeschwader 2 (StG 2—2nd Dive-Bomber Wing) on 13 February 1943. He led StG 2 in the battles of the Kuban bridgehead and Operation Citadel. In April and May, several other fighter and ground attack groups augmented his command. Following the failure of Operation Citadel in July 1943, he took command of all local ground attack units, named Gefechtsverband "Kupfer" (Combat Detachment "Kupfer"). He flew 636 combat missions and was shot down three times, all by ground fire.

On 1 September 1943, Kupfer was appointed General of the Ground Attack [aircraft] (General der Schlachtflieger) and promoted to Oberstleutnant. In this role he handled the procurement of the Focke-Wulf Fw 190, which was to replace the old and obsolete Junkers Ju 87 and especially the Henschel Hs 123. For this purpose he flew and visited a number of Schlachtgeschwader (ground attack wings) to meet with the various Geschwaderkommodore (wing commanders). He visited Oberstleutnant Kurt Kuhlmey, commander of Schlachtgeschwader 3, in early November 1943 and was killed when his Heinkel He 111 crashed returning to his base in bad weather on 6 November 1943. His body lay undiscovered until 17 November. He received a posthumous promotion to Oberst (Colonel) and was posthumously awarded the Knight's Cross of the Iron Cross with Oak Leaves and Swords.

Awards
 German Cross in Gold on 15 October 1942 as Major in the II./StG 2
 Iron Cross (1939) 2nd and 1st class
 Ehrenpokal der Luftwaffe on 14 October 1942 as Hauptmann and Staffelkapitän
 Knight's Cross of the Iron Cross with Oak Leaves and Swords
 Knight's Cross on 23 November 1941 as Hauptmann and Staffelkapitän of the 7./StG 2 "Immelmann"
 173rd Oak Leaves on 8 January 1943 as Major and Gruppenkommandeur of the II./StG 2 "Immelmann"
 62nd Swords on 11 April 1944 (posthumous) as Oberst and former Geschwaderkommodore of StG 2 "Immelmann"

References

Citations

Bibliography

 
 
 
 
 
 
 

1907 births
1943 deaths
Aviators killed in aviation accidents or incidents
German World War II pilots
Heidelberg University alumni
Luftwaffe pilots
Recipients of the Gold German Cross
Recipients of the Knight's Cross of the Iron Cross with Oak Leaves and Swords
Victims of aviation accidents or incidents in Greece
Military personnel from Bavaria
People from Coburg